Amorphoscelis villiersi is a species of praying mantis native to the Congo River area.

See also
List of mantis genera and species

References

Mantodea of Africa
Amorphoscelis
Insects described in 1984